Roger Harold Benjamin  (born ) is professor of Art History at the University of Sydney.

Benjamin is an Australian art historian and curator who was born and raised in Canberra, where he attended the Canberra Grammar School.  Moving to Melbourne, he trained in Fine Arts and Philosophy at the University of Melbourne (1975–79) before travelling to the United States for his MA (1981) and PhD (1985) at Bryn Mawr College, undertaking research in Paris. His first book and articles in French, British, and American journals focused on Matisse and the art of the Fauves (Matisse’s "Notes of a Painter": Criticism, Theory and Context, 1891-1908 Ann Arbor, 1987).

Benjamin moved back to Australia with his appointment as lecturer in Fine Arts at the University of Melbourne, where he taught for 14 years (1984–98). In 1995, he co-curated the travelling retrospective  for the Queensland Art Gallery and, in 1997, curated Orientalism: Delacroix to Klee at the Art Gallery of New South Wales. His long-standing interest in Orientalist art culminated in Orientalist Aesthetics: Art, Colonialism and French North Africa, 1880-1930 (Berkeley 2003), which received the prestigious Robert Motherwell Book Award in 2004.

Benjamin moved from Melbourne to Canberra as a research fellow at the Centre for Cross-Cultural Research at ANU (1998–2001). His work on contemporary Australian art includes the exhibition  (Sydney & Melbourne, 2006) and numerous writings on Tim Johnson. He has taught on Aboriginal art since 1992, and in 2009 curated Icons of the Desert: Early Aboriginal Painting from Papunya (Ithaca, New York) .

From 2003 to 2007, he was J. W. Power Professor and Director of the Power Institute at the University of Sydney, succeeding Virginia Spate. Academics whose postgraduate work Benjamin has supervised include Ian McLean, Mary Roberts, Chris McAuliffe, Charles Green, Caroline Jordan, Luke Gartlan, Natalie Adamson, and Stephen Gilchrist. Benjamin held the Australian Research Council’s DORA professorial fellowship from 2013 to 2016, resulting in his book Kandinsky and Klee in Tunisia, University of California Press, 2015.

Benjamin was elected Fellow of the Australian Academy of the Humanities in 2006.

Selected publications

References

1957 births
Bryn Mawr College alumni
Fellows of the Australian Academy of the Humanities
Living people
People educated at Canberra Grammar School
People from Canberra
University of Melbourne alumni
Academic staff of the University of Melbourne
Academic staff of the University of Sydney